The Kotmale Dam is a large hydroelectric and irrigation dam in Kotmale, Sri Lanka. Construction on the dam began in August 1979 and was ceremonially completed in February 1985. The dam forms the Kotmale Reservoir, which was renamed to Gamini Dissanayake Reservoir on 11 April 2003 following a request by Prime Minister Ranil Wickramasinghe.

See also 
 List of power stations in Sri Lanka
 List of dams and reservoirs in Sri Lanka
 Upper Kotmale Dam
 Kadadora Vihara

References 

1985 establishments in Sri Lanka
Buildings and structures in Nuwara Eliya District
Dams completed in 1985
Dams in Sri Lanka
Embankment dams
Hydroelectric power stations in Sri Lanka